Piercebridge railway station was a railway station serving the village of Piercebridge in County Durham, England. It was located on the Darlington and Barnard Castle Railway. The station opened in 1856 and closed as part of the Beeching cuts in 1965.

History
The line between Darlington and Barnard Castle opened up to traffic in July 1856. Piercebridge station, like ,  and  railway stations, opened up on the same day. The station had two platforms and like many other country stations, received and despatched goods traffic from the station sidings. The station was actually located in a place called Carlbury, just to the north of Piercebridge, which led to the development of the hamlet of Carlbury.

The station was closed to passengers in November 1964, with full closure in April 1965. The line remained open for a while longer to serve the Forcett branch, which left the main line just west of Piercebridge station. The line was completely closed in 1966.

References

Disused railway stations in the Borough of Darlington